Spiroceras is a genus of extinct ammonites.

References

Ammonite genera
Fossil taxa described in 1876
Ammonitida